Robert Graham Tunnicliff (25 June 1894 – 7 January 1973) was a New Zealand rugby union player. A hooker, Tunnicliff represented Nelson and Buller at a provincial level, and was a member of the New Zealand national side, the All Blacks, in 1923. He played one match for the All Blacks: the final game against the touring New South Wales team in 1923. Tunnicliff did not play in any internationals.

Tunnicliff was educated at Nelson College from 1909 to 1911 and served with the New Zealand Rifle Brigade in World War I.

References

1894 births
1973 deaths
People educated at Nelson College
New Zealand rugby union players
New Zealand international rugby union players
New Zealand farmers
New Zealand military personnel of World War I
Buller rugby union players
Rugby union players from Nelson, New Zealand
Nelson rugby union players
Rugby union hookers